Two Ways Home is a 2019 American drama film directed by Ron Vignone, starring Tanna Frederick, Tom Bower and Rylie Behr.

Cast
 Tanna Frederick as Kathy
 Tom Bower as Walter
 Rylie Behr as Cori
 Joel West as Junior
 Kim Grimaldi as Barbara
 Richard Maynard as Ed
 Pat Frey as Squibb

Release
The film was released in the United States on 29 December 2020.

Reception
Frank Scheck of The Hollywood Reporter wrote that the film's "palpable sense of place" and the "terrific" performances "compensates" for the film's "contrivances".

Diane Carson of KDHX wrote that the film is "honest in its invitation to consider those involved in and affected by mental illness, knowing the ripple effects reach far and wide" and "furthers the knowledge that everyone needs more information and can be educated through a sustained commitment if they only care."

John Sooja of Common Sense Media rated the film two stars out of five and wrote that while the film is "grounded" and "well-acted", the issues with the plot and the writing "hinder its emotional punch".

References

External links
 
 

American drama films
2019 drama films